Judith Regan (born August 17, 1953, in Massachusetts) is an American editor, producer, book publisher, and television and radio talk show host. She is the head of Regan Arts.

Early life and education
Regan grew up in Fitchburg, Massachusetts and Bay Shore, New York. She graduated from Bay Shore High School in 1971. She graduated from Vassar College in Poughkeepsie, New York in 1975 with a bachelor's degree in English and art history. She went on to study art at the School of the Museum of Fine Arts, Boston.

In 1977, she was recruited by The National Enquirer while working as a secretary at the Harvard Institute of Politics.

Personal life
Regan grew up in a large extended Sicilian and Irish family on a farm outside Fitchburg, Massachusetts.  Her parents Rita and Leo were both schoolteachers.  She is the middle child of two brothers and two sisters.

With psychologist David Buckley, whom she never married, she had son Patrick in 1980 or 1982. In 1987 she married New York City financial planner Robert Kleinschmidt.  Their daughter Lara was born in 1991. The couple separated soon after, and were divorced in 2000.

In 2001, she had an affair with Bernard B. Kerik, the New York City police commissioner and aide to Mayor Rudolph W. Giuliani.

She lives in New York City and Los Angeles.

Career

In the early 1980s, Regan wrote for and edited a number of publications, including National Enquirer. She produced a number of television shows, including Geraldo.

In the mid 1980s, she signed a deal with Simon & Schuster to write two books, including a history of the American family. She later canceled the contract in order to stay home with her young son, who had suffered a head injury after being hit by a drunken driver. Simon & Schuster then offered her a job as an editor, working from home.  During this time she worked with Howard Stern and Rush Limbaugh—-who called her “Dame” Judith Regan—-a reference to Dame Judith Anderson—-as well as new novelists such as Wally Lamb, Jess Walter, Walter Kirn, and Douglas Coupland.

She set up the imprint Regan Books with HarperCollins, where she signed new novelist Gregory Maguire, author of Wicked: The Life and Times of the Wicked Witch of the West.  Additional books involved in publishing include Confessions of an Ugly Stepsister, Wicked and Son of a Witch, also by Gregory Maguire; Stupid White Men by Michael Moore; Private Parts and Miss America by Howard Stern; The Game: Penetrating the Secret Society of Pickup Artists by Neil Strauss; Story: Substance, Structure, Style, and the Principles of Screenwriting by Robert McKee; Shabby Chic by Rachel Ashwell; She's Come Undone and I Know This Much Is True by Wally Lamb;  Juiced by Jose Canseco;  Domicilium Decoratus by Kelly Wearstler;  Shampoo Planet and Girlfriend in a Coma by Douglas Coupland;  Ruby Ridge, Citizen Vince, and Land of the Blind by Jess Walter; and American Soldier by Tommy Franks.

In 2006, Fox announced that Regan had interviewed O. J. Simpson, during which Simpson "confessed" to the 1994 murders of which he had been acquitted. The so-called confession was to air on the Fox network and Regan was to publish Simpson's written confession as a book entitled If I Did It.  After harsh criticism, News Corporation cancelled both the book and the interview with Simpson that was to air on the Fox Network.

  The book went on to be published and became a #1 bestseller. News Corp. fired Regan; she sued and won a reported $10 million.

From 1994 to 2004, Regan hosted a number of talk shows, including her own Judith Regan Tonight, a weekend talk show on the Fox News Channel.  She hosts a general interest talk radio show on Sirius and XM Satellite Radio.

After losing a bidding war to buy Phaidon Press, in 2013 she became the head of Regan Arts.

In popular culture
A 2007, season 17 episode of Law & Order titled "Murder Book" (episode 387–1716) features a character (Serena Darby) who is based loosely on Regan.

In a 2005, season 4 episode of Law & Order: Criminal Intent called "My Good Name," the media adviser to a Bernie Kerik-like character takes a phone call from a woman named "Judith" modeled after Regan. 

In 2006, she was parodied in a sketch in a season 12 episode (#1207) of the television show MADtv. In the sketch, two actors appear, one playing her and another playing O. J. Simpson.

In 2010, Regan appeared on The Millionaire Matchmaker (S3 E9) looking for a date.

In 2012, Regan appeared on Dr. Drew on the issue of single mother child rearing.

In 2012, Regan made several appearances on The Joy Behar Show.

Film and television production
 Ruby Ridge.  Executive Producer. CBS mini-series. 1996.
 Living Out Loud.  Actress, Cameo. 1998.
 House Arrest. Executive Producer, HBO. 2005
 Growing Up Gotti.  Executive Producer, A&E.  2004–2006.
 When the World Came to Town.   Universal. (in turnaround)
 Custody.  DreamWorks. (in turnaround)
 The Dive.  Producer with James Cameron and Barry Josephson.  (in development)
 I Know This Much Is True. Producer. Fox Studios. (in development)

References

External links

What Do Rush, Howard, Beavis and Butt-Head Have in Common? Among Other Things, the Brashest Editor in America, People magazine, February 14, 1994

1953 births
Living people
American book publishers (people)
Harvard University staff
American people of Irish descent
People from Fitchburg, Massachusetts
People from Bay Shore, New York
American people of Italian descent
Vassar College alumni
American women journalists
American book editors
21st-century American women
Bay Shore High School alumni